One Tambon One Product (OTOP) is a local entrepreneurship stimulus program designed by Thailand's former Prime Minister Thaksin Shinawatra during his 2001-2006 Thai Rak Thai government. The program aimed to support locally made and marketed products of each of Thailand's 7,255 tambons (sub-district). Drawing its inspiration from Japan's successful One Village One Product (OVOP) program, the OTOP program encourages village communities to improve the quality and marketing of local products, selecting one superior product from each tambon to receive formal branding as its "starred OTOP product". It provides both a local and national stage to the promote these products. OTOP includes a large array of local products, including traditional handicrafts, cotton and silk garments, pottery, fashion accessories, household items, and foods. After a military junta overthrew Thaksin's government in 2006 following an election cancelled for irregularities, the OTOP program was cancelled. However, it was soon revived and rebranded.

The One Tambon One Product movement is a self-help effort wherein rural communities participate in the creation of a product that can be sold locally and internationally.

Kittiphun Khongsawatkiat, Academician of the Thai Rak Thai Party "One Tambon One Product Working Group," revealed that the party aims to create a One Tambon One Product project for over 7,000 sub-districts across Thailand. To raise the income and living standards of the people to be self-reliant and become a truly strong sub-district, currently, 336 sub-districts are ready under this project concept.

Kittiphun Khongsawatkiat said that one set of policy-level committees would be established in implementing the stated policy. The OTOP project will be under the supervision of the Prime Minister's Office or the Ministry of Interior. By the nature of the work, it is not that the state brings money to promote, but to involve the villagers in thinking that there are goods or services in their villages, tourist attractions, and any distinctive culture. Then they will choose which product to be the product of the sub-district. While the government will help enhance technical skills and find marketing channels both domestically and internationally, the responsible agencies will use the form of e-commerce trading with a website "www.thaitambon.com" to be an information center.

Kittiphun Khongsawatkiat presented that in Oita City, Japan, the villages did a project like this and had great success. It takes up to 50 years because it started in a small village and then gradually expanded to the national level. But in Thailand, it won't take long because it starts from the government's policy down to the community. However, the results may not be seen clearly in the first 1–2 years and will be seen concrete in the 3–4 years of the new government. The source of funds will come from the People's Bank to be established. A fund of one million baht per village project (Village fund project) will provide low-interest loans circulating in the village, which people can use these funds to produce products in the sub-district.

Kittiphun Khongsawatkiat added, "The project's preparation requires the villagers to develop their wisdom to be creative. And sales will be in a modern marketing mix. There will be an exchange of goods between the sub-districts under the cooperative network. They need to set up community shops along the road to distribute goods and services and set up a community information center in the villages. Organize a tourist information center history and culture in the district and open a local restaurant for housewives and marketing to connect rural and urban communities."

However, the project was opposed by the Office of the National Economic and Social Development Council because it is a redundant project. If it is to be dismantled to the root, all related projects must be sorted out. In comparison, the agro-industrial side is afraid that there will be duplication of production until competition amongst themselves.

Management and organization
OTOP is managed by the Community Development Department (CDD) of Thailand's Interior Ministry.

There are 36,000 OTOP groups in Thailand, each having between 30 and 3,000 members. Sakda Siridechakul, president of Chiang Mai's OTOP association noted, "OTOP has helped spread income to many people in the villages. It has allowed people producing handicrafts to feel they are part of the global economy."

Financials
In 2017 OTOP product sales were 153 billion baht. The government aims for sales of 200-300 billion baht every year.

The government allocated an 8.3 billion baht budget to the CDD to stimulate community tourism in 3,273 villages across the country between April–September 2018. Among the program's aims are to develop at least 64,570 new OTOP items with an average annual sales growth of at least 10 percent.

In the FY2020 budget, the government allocated 363 million baht to support OTOP, down from 901 million baht in FY2019 and 1.24 billion baht in FY2018.

OTOP Product Champion
One of the mechanisms to promote and support the development of Thai OTOP products is the "Product Champion" (OPC). Besides setting up OTOP communities and small to medium enterprises (SME), a seminar called "Smart OTOP" has now provided more than 26,600 participants advice in improving their skills and knowledge in order to develop better products. The number of participants increases each year.

A rating system for OTOP products is followed, the highest being five stars. At last count, there were 569 five-star products.

See also
 One Town One Product (Republic of China)
 One Town, One Product (OTOP) – Philippines

References

External links
 

Economy of Thailand
Economic development programs
Entrepreneurship organizations
Government programmes of Thailand
Development in Asia